This is a list of diplomatic missions of Qatar. Qatar gained its independence in 1971, established its Ministry of Foreign Affairs and has since developed a diplomatic presence internationally.

Africa

 Algiers (Embassy)

 Porto-Novo (Embassy)

 Bangui (Embassy)

 N'Djamena (Embassy)

 Moroni (Embassy)

 Djibouti City (Embassy)

 Cairo (Embassy)

 Asmara (Embassy)

 Mbabane (Embassy)

 Addis Ababa (Embassy)

 Banjul (Embassy)

 Abidjan (Embassy)

 Nairobi (Embassy)

 Monrovia (Embassy)

 Tripoli (Embassy)
 Benghazi (Consulate-General)

 Nouakchott (Embassy)

 Rabat (Embassy)

 Abuja (Embassy)

 Kigali (Embassy)

 Dakar (Embassy)

 Mogadishu (Embassy)

 Pretoria (Embassy)

 Juba (Embassy)

 Khartoum (Embassy)

 Dar es Salaam (Embassy)

 Tunis (Embassy)

Americas

 Buenos Aires (Embassy)

 Brasília (Embassy)

 Ottawa (Embassy)

 San José (Embassy)

 Havana (Embassy)

 Santo Domingo (Embassy)

 Quito (Embassy)

 San Salvador (Embassy)

 Mexico City (Embassy)

 Panama City (Embassy)

 Asuncion (Embassy)

 Lima (Embassy)

 Washington, D.C. (Embassy)
 Houston (Consulate-General)
 Los Angeles (Consulate-General)
 New York City (Consulate-General)

 Montevideo (Embassy)

 Caracas (Embassy)

Asia

 Kabul (Embassy)

Baku (Embassy)

 Dhaka (Embassy)

 Bandar Seri Begawan (Embassy)

 Beijing (Embassy)
 Hong Kong (Consulate-General)

 Tbilisi (Embassy)

 New Delhi (Embassy)
 Mumbai (Consulate-General)

 Jakarta (Embassy)

 Tehran (Embassy)

 Tokyo (Embassy)

 Amman (Embassy)

 Astana (Embassy)

 Kuwait City (Embassy)

 Bishkek (Embassy)

 Beirut (Embassy)

 Kuala Lumpur (Embassy)

 Yangon (Embassy)

 Kathmandu (Embassy)

 Muscat (Embassy)

 Islamabad (Embassy)
 Karachi (Consulate-General)

 Gaza City (Representative Office)

 Manila (Embassy)

 Riyadh (Embassy)

 Singapore (Embassy)

 Seoul (Embassy)

 Colombo (Embassy)

 Dushanbe (Embassy)

 Bangkok (Embassy)

 Ankara (Embassy)
 Istanbul (Consulate-General)

 Ashgabat (Embassy)

 Hanoi (Embassy)

Europe

 Tirana (Embassy)

 Vienna (Embassy)

 Minsk (Embassy)

 Brussels (Embassy)

 Sarajevo (Embassy)

 Sofia (Embassy)

 Zagreb (Embassy)

 Nicosia (Embassy)

 Paris (Embassy)

 Berlin (Embassy)
 Munich (Consulate-General)

 Athens (Embassy)

 Budapest (Embassy)

 Rome (Embassy)
 Milan (Consulate-General)

 Valletta (Embassy)

 Chișinău (Embassy)

 The Hague (Embassy)

 Skopje (Embassy)

 Warsaw (Embassy)

 Lisbon (Embassy)

 Bucharest (Embassy)

 Moscow (Embassy)

 Belgrade (Embassy)

 Madrid (Embassy)
 Barcelona (Consulate-General)

 Stockholm (Embassy)

 Bern (Embassy)

 Kyiv (Embassy)

 London (Embassy)

Oceania

 Canberra (Embassy)

Multilateral organisations
 
Cairo (Permanent Mission)
 
Brussels (Permanent Representation)
 
Geneva (Permanent Mission)
New York City (Permanent Mission)

Gallery

See also
 Foreign relations of Qatar
 Ministry of Foreign Affairs (Qatar)
 2017 Qatar diplomatic crisis

References

External links

Ministry of Foreign Affairs of the State of Qatar

Diplomatic missions
Diplomatic missions
Qatar
Diplomatic missions of Qatar